The 1964 Edmonton municipal election was held October 14, 1964 to elect a mayor and twelve aldermen to sit on Edmonton City Council and seven trustees to sit on each of the public and separate school boards.

This was the first election since 1898 in which all officials were elected in the same year, and marked the introduction of a system whereby elections would be held only every two years.  It was also the first election that elected twelve aldermen; previous councils had had only ten aldermen.

The forty-six candidates for alderman were among the most in Edmonton's history. 

The election for aldermen was conducted, like that for mayor, at-large city-wide. Thus the ballot for each voter held the names of the 46 candidates for aldermen.
(This record for overall number of candidates was surpassed in the 2021 Edmonton municipal election. In 2021, the candidates were divided into twelve districts, and no ballot held more than 12 aldermanic candidates.)

Voter turnout

There were 94,880 ballots cast out of 199,259 eligible voters, for a voter turnout of 47.6%.

Results

(bold indicates elected, italics indicate incumbent)

Mayor

Aldermen
Councillors were elected through Plurality block voting , with each voter able to cast up to 12 votes. For that reason, more than 880,000 votes were cast in this election by the roughly 100,000 voters who cast a ballot.

46 candidates in total

Party slates:

Better Civic Government Committee  11 candidates  5 elected

Civil Rights Association 7 candidates  2 elected

United Voters Association 9 candidates  2 elected

Independents  19 candidates  3 elected

Doug Tomlinson was member of the Communist Party.

Public school trustees

Separate (Catholic) school trustees

References

City of Edmonton: Edmonton Elections

1964
1964 elections in Canada
1964 in Alberta